Corazón de criolla (English language: Heart of Criole) is a 1923 silent Argentine film directed and written by José A. Ferreyra.

Cast
Gloria Grat
Elena Guido as Rosa
Yolanda Labardén as Magna
Jorge Lafuente as Juan Carlos
César Robles

External links
 

Argentine silent films
1923 films
1920s Spanish-language films
Argentine black-and-white films
Films directed by José A. Ferreyra